Xerocrassa picardi is or was a species of air-breathing land snail, a terrestrial pulmonate gastropod mollusk in the family Geomitridae. 

This species is or was endemic to Israel.

Conservation status 
In the 1996 IUCN Red list, the species was listed as extinct or locally extinct.

According to the Mienis (2003), in 2003 the species was at the edge of extinction.

References

Further reading 
 Bar Z. 1978. Trochoidea picardi in western Galilee. Levantina 13: 32–134.

picardi

Gastropods described in 1933
Taxonomy articles created by Polbot
Taxobox binomials not recognized by IUCN